Łąkta Górna  is a village and sołectwo in the administrative district of Gmina Żegocina, within Bochnia County, Lesser Poland Voivodeship, in southern Poland.

Łąkta Górna is "Upper Łąkta". The neighbouring village of Łąkta Dolna (Lower Łąkta) is in Gmina Trzciana.

References

Villages in Bochnia County